House of the Disappeared is a 2017 South Korean mystery thriller film directed by Lim Dae-woong and written by Jang Jae-hyun. The film stars Kim Yun-jin, Ok Taec-yeon, and Jo Jae-yoon. It is a remake of the Venezuelan film The House at the End of Time.

Premise
Falsely arrested for murdering her husband, a woman returns to the house where the incident occurred after 25 years of imprisonment to solve the mystery surrounding her husband's death and son's disappearance.

Cast
 Yunjin Kim as Kang Mi-hee
 Ok Taec-yeon as Priest Choi
 Jo Jae-yoon as Chul-joong 
 Park Sang-hoon as Hyo-je 
 Go Woo-rim as Ji-won 
 Hwang Joon-woo as Joon-ho (young Priest Choi)
 Kwak Ji-hye as Yeon-hee
 Woo Sang-jeon as Old Hyo-je
 Kim Min-jung as Old grandmother
 Kim Hyun as Previous house owner
 Yoo In-young as Adult Yeon-hee (cameo)
 Lee Han-wi as Geomancer Jang (special appearance)
 Park Joon-myun as Female shaman (special appearance)
 Baek Do-bin as Detective Im (special appearance)
 Lee Dong-kyu as Young general manager Park (special appearance)

Production and release
Principal photography wrapped on December 15, 2016.

On March 24, 2017, sales company Finecut announced that House of the Disappeared was pre-sold to major Asian territories including Japan (New Select); Philippines (Viva Communications); Singapore, Malaysia, and Brunei (mm2 Entertainment); Taiwan (Long Shong International); and Vietnam (Red Pictures). The film was theatrically released in South Korea on April 5, 2017.

Awards and nominations

References

External links
 
 
 
 

2017 films
2017 thriller films
2010s mystery thriller films
2010s supernatural thriller films
South Korean mystery thriller films
South Korean supernatural thriller films
South Korean remakes of foreign films
Films about time travel
Haunted house films
2010s Korean-language films
Films about mother–son relationships
Little Big Pictures films
2010s South Korean films